The mafia hypothesis posits that brood parasite eggs are accepted by the host out of fear of retaliation (nest destruction) from the brood parasite, in an example of coevolution.

Amotz Zahavi proposed it in 1979, and it was tested by Manuel Soler in 1995.

Mathematical modeling 

Maria Abou Chakra, of the Max Planck Institute for Evolutionary Biology, with others, successfully mathematically modeled the mafia hypothesis as a viable strategy, conditional on two factors:

 hosts are capable of learning
 parasites revisit nests

They found that the proportion of mafia vs non mafia brood parasites and unconditionally vs conditionally accepting hosts cycled over time: if all hosts unconditionally accepted parasite eggs, then it would not be worth the effort of revisiting the nest- being 'mafia'. If sufficiently few parasites were mafia, then only accepting parasite eggs after nest destruction once would be best for the hosts. As such, the mafia proportion of parasites would increase, thereby leading to unconditional acceptance by hosts, and so on.

Farmer strategy 
Nest destruction also occurs as a result of 'farming'- attempts to synchronize the hosts' schedule with the parasites'. It bears similarities to the mafia strategy in that both engage in depredation of nests.

The farmer strategy complicates the mafia/non, un/conditional acceptance model, as in the case of farmers, rejection enters as a viable third host strategy.

References 

 Hoover, Jeffrey P.; Robinson, Scott K. (2007-03-13). "Retaliatory mafia behavior by a parasitic cowbird favors host acceptance of parasitic eggs". Proceedings of the National Academy of Sciences. 104 (11): 4479–4483. doi:10.1073/pnas.0609710104. ISSN 0027-8424. PMC 1838626. PMID 17360549.
 "Cuckoos Use Mafia Tactics, And They Work". IFLScience. Retrieved 2023-01-20.
 https://www.journals.uchicago.edu/doi/epdf/10.1086/283374 
 https://books.google.com/books?id=U3ZZDwAAQBAJ&pg=PA280&lpg=PA280&dq=mafia+hypothesis&source=bl&ots=qjFo2M8QNh&sig=ACfU3U0m_PqLXZR9VYAYcHFqV2ulb-rBOA&hl=en&sa=X&ved=2ahUKEwjA0eCJttb8AhXuMDQIHdprA4E4FBDoAXoECAIQAw#v=onepage&q=mafia%20hypothesis&f=false
 https://journal.afonet.org/vol93/iss4/art4/

Biology theories
Biological hypotheses